The Jerusalem Quartet is an Israeli string quartet, which made its debut in 1996. Their performance repertoire is wide and includes works of  Joseph Haydn, Wolfgang Amadeus Mozart, Franz Schubert, Johannes Brahms, Claude Debussy, Maurice Ravel and Dmitri Shostakovich.  They have toured extensively worldwide and three of their recordings have won BBC Music Magazine Awards.

They have recorded thirteen albums for the Harmonia Mundi label. The Jerusalem Quartet celebrated their 20th season in 2016 by releasing a two-CD album of Beethoven's six string quartets op. 18, and touring the United States, Australia, and several European countries.

Members
The original line-up included the violist Amihai Grosz. Grosz joined the Berlin Philharmonic as a principal in 2010, and also plays with the Philharmonic Octet Berlin.
Alexander Pavlovsky - first violin
Sergei Bresler - second violin
Ori Kam - viola
Kyril Zlotnikov - cello; the instrument is loaned to him by Daniel Barenboim and was played by Jacqueline du Pré

Protests
Due to the ensemble's name and their being perceived as cultural ambassadors for Israel, the Jerusalem Quartet has been subject to protests during their performances.  In 2010, a performance at London's Wigmore Hall which was being broadcast live on BBC Radio 3 was disrupted by multiple hecklers.  The broadcast had to be halted.

References

External links
Jerusalem Quartet official site

String quartets
Israeli classical music groups
BBC Radio 3 New Generation Artists